The First Stanhope Ministry was the seventh ministry of the Government of the Australian Capital Territory, and was led by Labor Chief Minister Jon Stanhope and his deputy Ted Quinlan. It was sworn in on 13 November 2001 after the Labor victory at the 2001 election. It had only one remaining one member from the previous Labor ministry under Rosemary Follett in 1995, Bill Wood. It operated until 4 November 2004, when a new ministry was sworn in following Labor's re-election at the 2004 election.

First arrangement

This covers the period from 13 November 2001 (when the Ministry was sworn in) until 23 December 2002. There was one change during this time, when, on 26 June 2002, Bill Wood was appointed to the new portfolio of Minister for Disability, Housing and Community Services.

Second arrangement

The year-old government initiated a significant reshuffle of the ministry 23 December 2002, coinciding with the appointment of a fifth minister in Katy Gallagher. There was one minor change after this point, when, on 26 May 2004, Gallagher's ministry for education, youth and family services was divided into separate responsibilities.

References

Australian Capital Territory ministries
Australian Labor Party ministries in the Australian Capital Territory